Sanna can refer to:

Places
Sanna, Nordland, an island in Træna municipality, Nordland county, Norway
Sanna, Ardnamurchan, a village in the far west of Scotland
Sänna, a village in Rõuge Parish, Võru County, Estonia
Sanna (Inn), a river in Austria, a tributary to the Inn
Sanna (Vistula), a river in Poland, a tributary to the Vistula

People
Sanna (name), including a list of people with this given name
Simone Sanna, an Italian Grand Prix motorcycle road racer
King Sanna, a Javanese king that ruled Java circa early 8th century CE

Other
Sanna (dish), a spongy rice cake, a Goan dish
Samjna, the Buddhist term (Sanskrit; Pali: sañña) meaning "perception"
Sanna 77, a type of submachine gun
Sanna, the native name of Cypriot Maronite Arabic

See also
Sana (disambiguation)
Sanaa (disambiguation)